The 672d Aircraft Control and Warning Squadron is an inactive United States Air Force unit. It was last assigned to the Boston Air Defense Sector, Air Defense Command, stationed at Barrington Air Force Station, Nova Scotia. It was inactivated on 1 June 1962.

The unit was a General Surveillance Radar squadron providing for the air defense of North America.

Lineage
 Established as 672d Aircraft Control and Warning Squadron
 Activated on 28 March 1949
 Inactivated on 8 December 1949
 Activated on 1 December 1956
 Discontinued and inactivated on 1 June 1962

Assignments
 503d Aircraft Warning and Control Group, 28 March 1949 - 8 December 1949
 32d Air Division, 1 December 1956
 Bangor Air Defense Sector, 15 August 1958
 Boston Air Defense Sector, 1 July 1960 – 1 June 1962

Stations
 Mitchel AFB, New York, 28 March 1949
 Roslyn AFS, New York, 1 April 1949
 Arlington, Virginia, 10 June 1949
 Gravelly Point, Virginia, 28 July 1949 - 8 December 1949
 Syracuse AFS, New York, 1 December 1956
 Barrington AS, Nova Scotia, 1 June 1957 – 1 June 1962

References

  Cornett, Lloyd H. and Johnson, Mildred W., A Handbook of Aerospace Defense Organization  1946 - 1980,  Office of History, Aerospace Defense Center, Peterson AFB, CO (1980).
 Winkler, David F. & Webster, Julie L., Searching the Skies, The Legacy of the United States Cold War Defense Radar Program,  US Army Construction Engineering Research Laboratories, Champaign, IL (1997).

External links

Radar squadrons of the United States Air Force
Aerospace Defense Command units